Myrmecia forceps is an Australian ant in the genus Myrmecia. This species is native to Australia and commonly distributed in most of the southern regions of Australia. They were described by Roger in 1861.

Characteristics
M. forceps is a moderately big bull ant at 19-24 mm long. Queens are the biggest at 25 mm, while the males are smaller. Their heads and thoraces are brown, femora are in a lighter brown colour, mandibles, antennae, and several other features can be yellow or reddish yellow.

References

Myrmeciinae
Hymenoptera of Australia
Insects described in 1861
Insects of Australia
Taxa named by Julius Roger